Pycnoporus cinnabarinus, also known as the cinnabar polypore, is a saprophytic, white-rot decomposer. Its fruit body is a bright orange shelf fungus. It is common in many areas and is widely distributed throughout the world. It is inedible. It produces cinnabarinic acid to protect itself from bacteria.

The stipe and the pore surface had a positive reaction with potassium hydroxide.

References

Fungi described in 1776
Inedible fungi
Polyporaceae